A Chance of Thunder is a 1961 British television series written by John Hopkins and produced by the BBC. It was transmitted in six episodes.

The BBC later wiped the series, and none of the six episodes are thought to survive.

Cast
 Clifford Evans as Steven Prador
 John Meillon as  Martin 
 Peter Vaughan as  Yardley
 Godfrey Quigley as Det. Sgt. Wilson
 Katherine Woodville as Pam Marchant
 Anthony Baird as  Coryn
 Anthony Bate as  Paul Rowlands
 Frank Gatliff as Trail
 Tom Adams as Evans
 Michael Collins as  Powell
 Robert James as  Hilton
 Ronald Lacey as Johnny Travers
 Michael Robbins as Mills
 Michael Rose as Taylor
 Peter Sallis as Howard
 Toke Townley as Frank White
 David Andrews as Alan Brewer
 Philip Stone as Ted Macauley
 Harvey Ashby as Scott
 Keith Barron as  Bank Cashier
 Edward Brooks as P.C. Chatfield
 Billy Milton as Gerald Brewer
 Morris Perry as PC Milner
 Topsy Jane as Stella Fairly

References

Bibliography
Baskin, Ellen. Serials on British Television, 1950-1994. Scolar Press, 1996.

External links
 

BBC television dramas
1961 British television series debuts
1961 British television series endings
English-language television shows